Acleris kuznetzovi is a species of moth of the family Tortricidae. It is found in China (Shansi) and the Russian Far East (Primorskij Kraj).

The wingspan is 15–20 mm.

The larvae feed on Populus species (including Populus coreana) and Viburnum burejaeticum.

References

Moths described in 1989
kuznetzovi
Moths of Asia